There are over 20,000 Grade II* listed buildings in England.  This page is a list of these buildings in the district of Wychavon in Worcestershire.

Wychavon

|}

Notes

References 
National Heritage List for England

External links

Wychavon
 Wychavon
Lists of listed buildings in Worcestershire